Central City is a complex of buildings in Seoul, South Korea. 

Central City, originally called Seoul General Terminal (서울종합터미날), was planned as a new intercity bus terminal in mid-1970s. The original plan was changed to accommodate Honam and Yeongdong line express bus lines due to neighbouring being Seoul Express Bus Terminal overcrowded. Yul San Group bought the terminal site from Seoul City government in 1977. Actual construction started in December 1994. Central City opened in 1 September 1999. In 2012, Shinsegae Group bought a 60.02% share of Central City. 

Central City consists of three commercial areas: bus terminal, department store, and shopping mall. Among these buildings are the JW Marriott Hotel Seoul, Central City Terminal, Megabox movie theater, Shinsegae and Bandinlunis bookstore.

Central City Terminal
The main feature of this complex is bus terminal. Central City terminal, shown as 서울호남 (Seoul-Honam) or 센트럴 (Central) on tickets, is a main gateway for express bus routes from Jeolla and part of Chungcheong region. Central City is served by the following express and intercity bus lines:

External links

Buildings and structures in Seocho District
Bus stations in South Korea
Shinsegae Group